Petko Kichev (born 9 June 1950) is a Bulgarian archer. He competed in the men's individual event at the 1980 Summer Olympics.

References

External links
 

1950 births
Living people
Bulgarian male archers
Olympic archers of Bulgaria
Archers at the 1980 Summer Olympics
Place of birth missing (living people)